Süleymaniye is a village in the District of Akseki, Antalya Province, Turkey. 

Its old name is Simyan. It is one of the oldest settlements in the area where it is located. The Hadım Plateau is located to the north.

History
The area was conquered by the Seljuk Turks and the Ottoman Empire along with other towns in the area in the 1600s.

Economy
The village used to have a primary school, but it has since closed. The town has a health center with a midwife that can be accessed via an asphalt road. The town also has a drinking water network, electricity, and fixed telephones.
 
The country boasts an economy based on the cattle and almond trade.

References

Villages in Akseki District